Sri Lanka will compete at the 2013 World Championships in Athletics in Moscow, Russia, from 10–18 August 2013.
A team of 8 athletes was announced to represent the country in the event. The men's 4x400 relay team qualified for the event by meeting the qualification time and winning the bronze medal at the 2013 Asian Athletics Championships in Pune, India. Both Lakmali and Merill qualified for the event by breaking the national record in their respective events (and by exceeding the qualification standard).

Results
(q – qualified, NM – no mark, SB – season best)

Men
Track and road events

Athletes in italics did not race

Women
Track and road events

Field events

References

External links
 IAAF World Championships – Sri Lanka

Nations at the 2013 World Championships in Athletics
2013 in Sri Lankan sport
Sri Lanka at the World Championships in Athletics